Nosphistia is a genus of skippers in the family Hesperiidae.

References
Natural History Museum Lepidoptera genus database

Hesperiidae
Hesperiidae genera
Taxa named by Eugène Boullet
Taxa named by Paul Mabille